Parallax is the fourth studio album by guitarist Greg Howe, released on November 7, 1995 through Shrapnel Records.

Critical reception

Andy Hinds at AllMusic awarded Parallax 2.5 stars out of 5, describing it as following the same outline as Howe's two previous albums, Introspection (1993) and Uncertain Terms (1994). He said it "doesn't offer any surprises, but delivers mind-blowing guitar performances by the truckload" and that "guitar geeks will revel in the over-the-top decadence of this highly indulgent instrumental shred-fest." As with Introspection, he criticized the album's production as "rather clinical-sounding (especially those triggered drums)", but praised the evolution of Howe's guitar tone: "His guitar tone has evolved from a brash, metallic sound (heard in his earlier work) to a smooth, compressed signal, which suits his extended legato forays quite well."

Track listing

Personnel
Greg Howe – guitar, keyboard, engineering, mixing, production
Jon Doman – drums (except track 7)
Kevin Soffera – drums (track 7)
Andy Ramirez – bass
Kenneth K. Lee Jr. – mastering

References

External links
In Review: Greg Howe "Parallax" at Guitar Nine Records

Greg Howe albums
1995 albums
Shrapnel Records albums
Albums recorded in a home studio